Kozhaniy Olen'  is the Ukrainian ska-punk band from Simferopol, created in 1998.

History 
The band was started by a future trumpeter Pavel Shvets and the guitarist Andrey Zamotaylov in 1998 while still studying at school. The texts of the songs of the collective in particular contain obscene expressions and pornography themes, the name of their debut album - «17.5 cm» (2004). The first official video for the song titled ОРЗ was presented on Sep 26, 2009 on «Enter Music». The song is about non-traditional approach to the treatment of influenza and other respiratory ailments.

Members of group
 Andrey Zamotaylov - rhythm guitar, vocals, the founder of the band
 Pavel «PapaJoe» Shvets - trumpet, backing vocals, songwriter, the founder of the band
 Eugene «Slamp» Zavaliy - solo-guitar, backing vocals
 Alexey «insa» Strebkov - drums
 Yury Fateykin - bass guitar, backing vocals

Discography
 2004 — «17,5 см»
 2010 — «Триста баксов и дорога»
 2013 — «Снегири и Суперклей»
 2017 — «Кашель Нины»

Music videos
ОРЗ (2009)

Singles
 ОРЗ (2004)
 Afanasy (2004)
 Monika (2004)
 Rape me (Nirvana cover) (2009)
 Jopa (2009)
 8 марта (2012)

References

External links 
 Official site 
 On myspace
 On last.fm
 On livejournal.com

Ukrainian musical groups